Radu is a masculine Romanian given name of Slavic etymological origin, derived from the Old Church Slavonic root rad- (cf. радъ "glad"). Radu became widespread among the (non-Slavic) Romanians because of Radu Negru's status as legendary founder of Wallachia, a historical Romanian state. Many Wallachian and some Moldavian voivodes or princes have been named Radu. 
Notable people named Radu include:

A 

 Radu Albot (born 1989), Moldovan tennis player
 Radu Aldulescu (1922–2006), Romanian-Italian cellist
 Radu Aldulescu (born 1954), Romanian novelist
 Radu Almășan (born 1980), Romanian singer of the band Bosquito
 Radu Aricescu, Romanian-British molecular neuroscientist

B 

 Radu Barbu (born 1989), Romanian football player
 Radu Băldescu (1888–1953), Romanian general during World War II
 Radu Bălescu (1932–2006), Romanian and Belgian physicist
 Radu Beligan (1918–2016), Romanian actor and director
 Radu Berceanu (born 1953), Romanian engineer and politician
 Radu Gioan Bey (1613–1660), Prince of Moldavia
 Radu Bîrzan (born 1999), Romanian football player
 Radu Boboc (born 1999), footballer
 Radu Boureanu (1906–1997), Romanian poet and writer
 Radu Budișteanu (1902–1991), activist of the Iron Guard
 Radu Buzescu (fl. c. 1593–1601), boyar of Wallachia during the reign of Michael the Brave

C 

 Radu Câmpeanu (1922–2016), Romanian politician and jurist
 Radu Catan (born 1989), Moldovan football player
 Radu Chiriac (born 2000), Romanian football player
 Radu Ciobanu (born 1975), Romanian football player
 Radu Ciuceanu (1928–2022), Romanian historian and politician
 Radu Crișan (born 1996), Romanian football player

D 

 Radu Dărăban (born 1983), Romanian fencer
 Traian Rafael Radu Demetrescu (1866–1896), Romanian writer
 Radu Doicaru (born 1979), Romanian football player
 Radu Drăgușin (born 2002), Romanian football player
 Radu Dudescu (1894–1983), Romanian architect

F 

 Radu Filipescu (born 1955), Romanian anti-communist dissident
 Radu Florescu (1925–2014), Romanian historian and academic, professor at Boston College

G 

 Radu Gabrea (1937–2017), Romanian filmmaker
 Radu Pavel Gheo (born 1969), Romanian writer
 Radu Ghiță (born 1990), Romanian handball player
 Radu Gînsari (born 1991), Moldovan football player
 Radu Goldiș (born 1947), Romanian-American jazz guitarist
 Adrian Radu Gontariu (born 1984), Romanian volleyball player
 Radu Grigorovici (1911–2008), Romanian physicist
 Radu Gyr (pen name of Radu Demetrescu; 1905–1975), Romanian poet and writer

I 

 Radu Irimescu (1890–1975), Romanian businessman, politician, and diplomat
 Radu Ivan (born 1969), Romanian judo practitioner

J 

 Radu Jercan (1945–2012), Romanian football player
 Radu Jude (born 1977), Romanian filmmaker

K 

 Radu Klapper (1937–2006), Romanian-Israeli poet and author
 Radu Korne (1895–1949), Romanian general during World War II

L 

 Radu Lazăr (born 1947), Romanian water polo player
 Radu Lecca (1890–1980), Romanian spy and journalist
 Radu Lefter (born 1970), Romanian football player
 Radu Leonte (born 1991), Romanian football player
 Radu Lupu (born 1945), Romanian pianist

M 

 Radu Malfatti (born 1943), Austrian trombone player and composer
 Radu Manicatide (1912–2004), Romanian engineer and aircraft constructor
 Radu Marculescu, electrical engineer
 Radu Mareș (1941–2016), Romanian writer and journalist
 Radu Marian (born 1977), Moldavian singer sopranist
 Radu Ștefan Mazăre (born 1968), Romanian politician
 Radu Mihăileanu (born 1958), Romanian-French actor and filmmaker
 Radu Mîțu (born 1994), Romanian football player
 Radu Motreanu (born 1998), Romanian football player
 Radu Muntean (born 1971), Romanian filmmaker

N 

 Radu Negulescu (born 1941), Romanian table tennis player
 Radu Neguț (born 1981), Romanian football player
 Radu Niculescu (born 1975), Romanian football player
 Radu Nunweiller (born 1944), Romanian football player

P 

 Radu Paladi (1927–2013), Romanian composer, pianist, and conductor
 Radu Paliciuc (born 1988), Romanian basketball player
 Radu Pamfil (1951–2009), Romanian football player
 Miron Radu Paraschivescu (1911–1971), Romanian writer
 Radu Petrescu (born 1980), Romanian rugby referee
 Radu Marian Petrescu (born 1982), Romanian football referee
 Radu Podgorean (born 1955), Romanian politician
 Radu Poklitaru (born 1972), Moldovan choreographer
 Dumitru Radu Popa (born 1949), Romanian-American writer
 Dumitru Radu Popescu (born 1935), Romanian writer
 Mihai Radu Pricop (1950–2018), Romanian politician

R 

 Radu Rebeja (born 1973), Moldovan football player
 Radu Rogac (born 1995), Moldovan football player
 Prince Radu of Romania (born 1960 as Radu Duda), husband of Margareta of Romania, pretender to the Romanian throne
 Radu Rosetti (1853–1926), Moldavian and Romanian politician and writer
 Radu D. Rosetti (1874–1964), Romanian writer
 Radu R. Rosetti (1877–1949), Romanian general and historian

S 

 Radu Sabău (born 1968), Romanian water polo player
 Radu Sabo (born 1971), Romanian football player
 Radu Scîrneci (1926−2015), Romanian alpine skier
 Radu Scoarță (born 1999), Romanian football player
 Radu Simion (1940–2015), Romanian pan flute player
 Radu Sîrbu (born 1978), Moldovan pop singer, formerly of the boy band O-Zone
 Radu Stanca (1920–1962), poet, playwright, theatre director
 Radu Stroe (born 1949), Romanian navigational engineer and politician
 Radu Lucian Sulica, Romanian-American physician and laryngologist

T 

 Radu Țârle (born 1967), Romanian politician
 Radu Timofte (1949–2009), Romanian soldier, politician, and spy chief
 Radu Troi (born 1949), Romanian football player
 Radu Țuculescu (born 1949), Romanian novelist and playwright
 Radu Tudoran (1910–1992), Romanian novelist

V 

 Radu Varia (born 1940), art critic and historian
 Radu Vasile (1942–2013), former prime minister of Romania
 Radu G. Vlădescu (1886–1964), Romanian professor of veterinary medicine
 Radu Voina (born 1950), Romanian handball player

Z 

 Radu Zaharia (born 1989), football player

Romanian rulers 

This section is organized chronologically.

 Radu Negru (Radu the Black; born 1269), legendary founder of Wallachia
 Radu I of Wallachia (fl. c. 1377–1383), Voivode of Wallachia, sometimes identified as Radu Negru
 Radu II of Wallachia (Radu II Praznaglava, Radu II Empty Head, Radu the Bald; died c. 1428), reigned intermittently from 1420–1427
 Radu the Handsome (Radu cel Frumos, Radu III of Wallachia; 1437/1439–1475), the younger brother of Vlad III the Impaler
 Radu IV the Great (Radu cel Mare; 1467–1508), son of Vlad Călugărul, reigned 1495–1508
 Radu Bădica (died 1524), son of Radu IV the Great, reigned 1523–1524
 Radu of Afumați (Radu de la Afumaţi; died 1529), son of Radu cel Mare, reigned intermittently from 1522–1529
 Radu Paisie (Radu VII Paise, Petru I; fl. 1534-1545), son of Radu cel Mare, reigned almost continuously from 1535–1545
 Radu Ilie Haidăul (died 1558), son of Radu of Afumați, reigned 1552–1553
 Radu Mihnea (1586–1626), son of Mihnea Turcitul, reigned from 1601–1602, 1611, 1611–1616, and 1620–1623
 Radu Șerban (died 1620), reigned from 1602–1610 and in 1611
 Radu Iliaș (died 1632), son of Alexandru Iliaș, reigned in 1632
 Radu Leon (also Radu the Oyster-seller; died 1669), son of Leon Tomșa, reigned 1664–1669

Other uses 

 Radu Barvon, a character in the light novel series Trinity Blood
 George Ivașcu, Romanian journalist who used the pen name "Radu Vardaru"
 Sofronie Drincec, Romanian Orthodox bishop born "Radu Ștefan Drincec"

See also 

 
 Radu (surname)

Romanian masculine given names